John Kevin Hines (born August 30, 1981) is an American suicide prevention speaker who attempted suicide by jumping from the Golden Gate Bridge in San Francisco, California. His story gained major media coverage and he has since become a motivational speaker and advocate for suicide prevention.

Hines has been featured on CNN, HuffPost, ABC News, Larry King Now, and The Today Show. He has spoken at schools, colleges, and universities to share his story. He co-founded the Kevin and Margaret Hines Foundation (KMHF), a 501(c)(3) organization based in Atlanta, Georgia, that provides funding and education for suicide prevention in the United States and elsewhere.

Early life
When Hines was nine months old, he was adopted by Pat and Debbie Hines in the San Francisco area. At the age of ten, he was put on Tegretol to help control his epileptic seizures. After being taken off the drug at the age of 16, he began experiencing symptoms of bipolar disorder. Hines was also upset by the suicide of his drama teacher. In September 2000, he wrote a suicide note.

Suicide attempt
On Monday, September 25, 2000, Hines traveled by bus to the Golden Gate Bridge. ABC News reported Hines began hearing voices in his head telling him to die. Hines threw himself over the rail. After leaping, Hines instantly felt regret. He turned himself around to land in the water legs first. After he surfaced, he felt a creature nudging his body which was a sea lion helping to keep Hines afloat until he was rescued by the Coast Guard.

Aftermath
The New York Post reported: "Now Hines, when he had recently been diagnosed with bipolar disorder, tells his story to at-risk groups around the nation, urging people to get treatment for mental illness and helping them realize that suicide is not the answer." According to the San Francisco Magazine, he now works as a mental-health advocate.

Public and media appearances
Hines has been featured by CNN, HuffPost, ABC News, Larry King Now, The Today Show, BuzzFeed, PBS, 9 news Australia, The New York Post, Time, Business Insider, Newsweek, Forbes, Fox News, Reddit, and other media outlets.

Hines also co-wrote and starred in the documentary Film, Suicide: The Ripple Effect, which was awarded Best Story at the Nice International Film Festival in Nice, France, in 2018.

Activism

Hines's mission, through his Kevin and Margaret Hines Foundation, is to provide mental health education and suicide prevention information through worldwide public speaking engagements, research initiatives. It has a YouTube channel that focuses on mental health.  He has campaigned for the installation of a safety net  around the Golden Gate Bridge to catch people who jump. The net has started construction and the project is scheduled to be completed in 2023. When Hines saw the first parts of the net, he wept and said, "This is one of the most special days of my life".

Awards and nominations 
 American Foundation for Suicide Prevention Lifesaver of the Year Award
 Mental Health America: The Clifford Whittingham Beers Award
 Young Minds Advocacy: Mental Health Champion
 NoStigmas: Hero Award
 National Council Community Behavioral Healthcare: Lifetime Achievement Award
 San Francisco Police Department: Commendation Award

References 

Living people
Suicide prevention
Mental health activists
1981 births
American adoptees
People with epilepsy
People with bipolar disorder